The Perfect Holiday is a 2007 comedy film directed by Lance Rivera, starring Gabrielle Union, Morris Chestnut, Charlie Murphy, and Terrence Howard, and is produced by Academy Award-nominated actress Queen Latifah, who also serves as narrator. The film was released on December 12, 2007. It was also the first film by Destination Films to receive a wide release since Beautiful.

Plot

Benjamin (Morris Chestnut) is an aspiring songwriter who attempts to break into the music business by giving a copy of his recording track of a Christmas album to a rap artist named J-Jizzy (Charles Q. Murphy). Nancy (Union) is a divorced mother, who is too busy taking care of her three children to take care of herself.  Her daughter Emily (Khail Bryant) overhears her mother say that she wished for a compliment from a man, and the daughter tells the local mall's Santa Claus about her mother's wish.

The Santa Claus turns out to be Benjamin, who notices Nancy.  Later, while sitting in a Starbucks after his shift as Santa, Benjamin and his friend Jamal (Faizon Love) see Nancy go into a dry cleaners. Benjamin borrows Jamal's jacket, pretends to drop it off at the cleaners, tells Nancy that she's a very attractive woman (granting her wish), and leaves. Eventually, the two start to date and end up falling in love—without Ben realizing that Nancy's ex-husband is J-Jizzy.

Things take a turn for the worse, however, because Nancy's oldest son, John-John (Malik Hammond) is jealous of Benjamin going out with his mother and plots to break up the relationship. What follows is a series of funny and touching scenes that show viewers what "family" is really about.

Queen Latifah and Terrence Howard play omniscient roles in the movie. Howard is a mischievous and sly angel named "Bah Humbug", while Latifah is the kind, thoughtful angel, called "Mrs. Christmas".

Cast
Gabrielle Union - Nancy Taylor
Morris Chestnut - Benjamin Armstrong
Charlie Murphy - J-Jizzy
Malik Hammond - John-John Taylor
Jeremy Gumbs - Mikey Taylor
Khail Bryant - Emily Taylor
Faizon Love - Jamal
Jill Marie Jones - Robin
Katt Williams - Delicious
Queen Latifah - Mrs. Christmas
Rachel True - Brenda
Terrence Howard - Bah Humbug

Reception
The film was neither a critical nor commercial success. Rotten Tomatoes reported that  of critics gave positive reviews based on  reviews. It has a consensus stating The Perfect Holiday is the perfect example of Christmas movie clichés run amok. Metacritic gave the film a 32 out of 100 approval rating based on 22 reviews, indicating "generally unfavorable reviews". On its opening weekend, it opened poorly at #6 with $2.2 million. The film grossed $5.8 million domestically.

References

External links
 
 
 A Father and Son’s Perfect Holiday - Dad and 7 year old son discuss performing stunts in Queen Latifah's film at Mosaec.com

2007 films
2007 romantic comedy films
African-American films
American Christmas comedy films
American romantic comedy films
Films shot in New Jersey
Films scored by Christopher Lennertz
2000s English-language films
2000s American films